Esaie Fongang (born 28 August 1943) is a Cameroonian middle-distance runner. He competed in the men's 1500 metres at the 1972 Summer Olympics.

References

1943 births
Living people
Athletes (track and field) at the 1972 Summer Olympics
Cameroonian male middle-distance runners
Cameroonian male long-distance runners
Olympic athletes of Cameroon
Place of birth missing (living people)